is a Japanese women's professional shogi player ranked 1-dan.

Early life
Tsukuda was born on August 27, 1998, in Suginami, Tokyo.  Her father Yasuaki is a professional shogi player and her mother Sachiko is a retired women's professional shogi player.

Promotion history
Tsukada's promotion history is as follows:

 2-kyū: October 1, 2014
 1-kyū: June 23, 2017
 1-dan: April 1, 2019

Note: All ranks are women's professional ranks.

References

External links
 ShogiHub: Tsukada, Erika

1998 births
Living people
People from Suginami
Japanese shogi players
Women's professional shogi players
Professional shogi players from Tokyo Metropolis